Tulpo Airport  is a high elevation airport serving the village of Santa Clara de Tulpo in the La Libertad Region of Peru. The runway sits across a ridge above the village, with mountainous terrain in all quadrants.

See also

Transport in Peru
List of airports in Peru

References

External links
SkyVector - Tulpo
OpenStreetMap Tulpo Airport

Airports in Peru
Buildings and structures in La Libertad Region